Nor-Nor Emmanuel Maviram (born 4 April 2001) is a Nigerian professional footballer who plays as a left-back for Portuguese club Länk Vilaverdense on loan from Vizela.

Professional career
A youth product of Gee-Lec Academy and Porto, Maviram began his senior career with Pedras Salgadas on 2 September 2020. He transferred to Vizela on 2 February 2021, signing a contract until 2024. He made his professional debut with Vizela in a 4–0 Segunda Liga win over Leixões on 29 March 2021.

References

External links
 
 

2001 births
Sportspeople from Jos
Living people
Nigerian footballers
Association football fullbacks
Juventude de Pedras Salgadas players
F.C. Vizela players
Vilaverdense F.C. players
Primeira Liga players
Liga Portugal 2 players
Campeonato de Portugal (league) players
Nigerian expatriate footballers
Expatriate footballers in Portugal
Nigerian expatriate sportspeople in Portugal